Aaru Mooru Ombhatthu is a 1970 Indian Kannada film, directed and produced by K. S. L. Swamy. The film stars Udaykumar, Srinath, Ramesh and Ravi in the lead roles. The film has musical score by Vijaya Bhaskar.

Cast

References

External links

1970 films
1970s Kannada-language films
Films scored by Vijaya Bhaskar
Films based on Indian novels
Indian drama films
Films directed by K. S. L. Swamy
1970 drama films